Road speed limits in Ireland apply on all public roads in the state. These are signposted and legislated for in kilometres per hour. Speed limits are demarcated by regulatory road signs. These consist of white circular signs with a red outline. Speed limits are marked in black with "km/h" below the speed limit. Smaller "repeater" speed limit signs are used along stretches of road where there is no change in speed limit, in order to remind motorists currently on the road and to inform traffic merging from junctions that a certain speed limit applies.

History
This situation was updated in 1933 with Road Traffic Act 1933 prescribing an ordinary speed limit of 25 mph (40 km/h) for light motor vehicles or heavy motor vehicles fitted with pneumatic tyres. Lower speed limits were applied for heavy motor vehicles without some pneumatic tyres, or used for pulling another vehicle. Road signage was established by the Traffic Signs Regulations, 1956.

However, the main piece of legislation responsible for the introduction of speed limits in Ireland was Part IV of the Road Traffic Act, 1961. This repealed the 1933 Act and allowed the Minister for the Environment to prescribe a general speed limit through regulations made under this Act. It also allowed local authorities to specify special speed limits through regulations made under this Act.

This replaced the  speed limit in all but a few cases where regulations had been drafted specifically to impose a  limit. While the built up area and special speed limits were clearly indicated to motorists by the number 30, 40 or 50 in black numbers on a white circular background with a red outline, there was no such signage for the general  speed limit. This was indicated to motorists by a "general speed limit" applies sign which consisted of a circular white sign with a black diagonal line bisecting it. Some drivers remained unaware of this change. A review of speed limits from 1990-92 restored the 60 mph limit.

It was not until 1992 that a 70 mph (113 km/h) speed limit was authorised on the State's motorways. This occurred through the Road Traffic (Speed Limits) (County of Kildare) (Amendment) Regulations, 1992 and the similar Road Traffic (Speed Limits) (County Borough of Dublin and County of Dublin) (Amendment) Regulations, 1992. This authorised traffic on the M1, M7, M11 and M50 to travel at 70 mph (113 km/h) where signposted.  This was extended to motorways in general by the Road Traffic Act, 1994. A minimum speed limit of  had previously been set in 1974 through the Local Government (Roads and Motorways) Act, 1974.

On 20 January 2005, Ireland adopted metric speed limits.  Around 35,000 existing signs were replaced and a further 23,000 new signs erected bearing the speed limit in kilometres per hour. To avoid confusion with the old signs, each speed limit sign now has "km/h" beneath the numerals.

During the period 2000-2010, the state underwent a massive road building programme which included the construction of a national motorway network. Many sections of this "motorway network" such as the N6 from Kinnegad to Kilbeggan were originally built to high quality dual carriageway standard. The Roads Act, 2007 enacted in July 2007 made a provision for the redesignation of dual carriageways to motorway. This meant the hard shoulder of the high quality dual carriageways chosen to be redesignated, had to be changed from a broken yellow line to a continuous yellow line. Green signage also had to be changed to blue. In some instances the cost of this retrofit ran to millions of euro as it involved the replacement of existing gantry and large panel signage as well as the application of hundreds of kilometres of thermoplastic road paint. In September 2008, the Cahir to Cashel stretch of the M8 had its gantry signage changed and hard shoulder re-painted. Parts of the M6 also underwent the same process.

In February 2012 Leo Varadkar, the Minister for Transport, Tourism and Sport, tasked a working group with reviewing speed-limit policy and implementation. Its report, published in 2013, identified two key issues: inconsistency of limits between similar roads, and inappropriateness of limits on some roads. It found the default limits were unsafely high on many minor roads where they applied. It recommended the introduction of a "rural speed limit" sign, to emphasise that the statutory maximum speed was not necessarily a safe speed. The Rural Speed Limit Sign (RUS 041A) consists of a 450mm diameter white disk with a black border and oblique parallel black bars (not to be confused with the 'end of speed limit' sign in existence in Ireland prior to the 2004 Road Traffic Act). This was introduced in 2015 with the publication of the Guidelines for Setting and Managing Speed Limits in Ireland (The Guidelines) as a combination of Sign RUS 041A and Plate P 080 (bilingually reading SLOW and ); it can only be used on single-lane local Tertiary roads and selected single-lane Local Secondary roads and not on national, regional, or local primary roads.

Signs

Ordinary speed limits

Different default speed limits apply to particular categories of roads. Default speed limits are termed as "ordinary speed limits" by the Road Traffic Act 2004. There are also speed restrictions for certain classes of vehicles. As of 2007, the ordinary speed limits are as follows:
 for motorways
 for National Routes (Primary and Secondary) that are not motorway status.
 for local and regional roads.
 in built up areas.

Special speed limits

  (for Dual Carriageways forming part of a national road only)

There are particular powers available to local county councils under the Road Traffic Act 2004 to apply "special speed limits" to particular stretches of road. Special speed limits of 30, 50, 60, 80, 100 and 120 km/h (19, 31, 37, 50, 62 and 75 mph) can be imposed, but only 30 and 60 km/h (19 and 37 mph) are exclusively "special" as opposed to the others which are "ordinary". The  limit is ordinary for motorways but can be special for dual carriageways forming part of a national primary road. Special speed limits are usually lower than normal, for schools, etc. One instance of higher speed limits being applied is that of the new N2 route from the M50 motorway in Fingal (Dublin) to north of Ashbourne, County Meath where a special speed limit of 120 km/h (75 mph) was imposed from 15 June 2006, therefore becoming the first non-motorway road in Ireland to obtain this speed limit. According to the project engineers, the National Roads Authority decided due to the lack of available space at the M50 junction to accommodate a parallel joining non-motorway route that they would designate the new road as high-quality dual carriageway and block off the existing road from the M50.

Cautionary speed limits
The Minister for Transport issued a direction to road authorities under section 95(16) of the Road Traffic Act 1961 in February 2007 with respect to a range of non-regulatory traffic signs. Chapter 8 of the Traffic Signs Manual was superseded by an updated version which allowed for the erection of signage stating a cautionary speed limit in the vicinity of road works. They are not legally binding on motorists or legally enforceable by the Garda Síochána and it not known if 'compliance' with these Cautionary speed limits is taken into account in the event of a road traffic collision, however, motorists must always drive at a speed appropriate to the prevailing conditions whilst not exceeding the speed limit.

Road works speed limits
The manager of a city or county council can reduce the speed limit on a road undergoing road works for a stated period of time by executive order under powers available to him/her under the Road Traffic Act 2004. The reduced speed limits are typically 30, 50 or 90 km/h (19, 31 or 56 mph). These are different from cautionary speed limits as they are binding on drivers and it is an offence to exceed a road works speed limit.

See also
Road signs in the Republic of Ireland

References

Citations

Sources
 

Roads in the Republic of Ireland
Road transport in the Republic of Ireland
Ireland